The RMIT School of Health and Biomedical Sciences is an Australian tertiary education school within the College of Science Engineering and Health of RMIT University. It was created in 2016 from the former schools of Health Sciences, Life and Physical Sciences and Medical Sciences.

See also
RMIT University

References

External links
School of Health and Biomedical Sciences

Health and Biomedical Sciences
Medical schools in Australia
Dental schools in Australia
Nursing schools in Australia
Chiropractic schools in Australia
Optometry schools
Pharmacy schools
Science and technology in Melbourne